Ehrendorferia (eardrops) is a genus of two species of biennial or perennial herbaceous plants native to wildfire-prone areas of California and the Baja California peninsula. It was named after the Austrian botanist Friedrich Ehrendorfer on the occasion of his 70th birthday.

Species
There are two species:

References

External links

Fumarioideae
Papaveraceae genera